Chikanobu is a Japanese name which can apply to a number of artists of the Edo period:

Kanō Chikanobu (1660–1728) of the Kanō school
Matsuno Chikanobu (fl. 1720s) of the Kaigetsudō school
Kitagawa Chikanobu (fl. early 19th century), student of Utamaro
Toyohara Chikanobu (1838–1912) of the Utagawa school